Newlands is a surname. Notable people with the surname include:

Francis G. Newlands, American senator
George Newlands, Scottish theologian
Henry William Newlands, Canadian politician
John Newlands (Australian politician), Australian politician
John Alexander Reina Newlands, English chemist
James Newlands, British civil engineer